Franco Grilla (born July 21, 1970) is a former American football placekicker who played three seasons in the Arena Football League with the Albany Firebirds and Orlando Predators. He played college football at the University of Central Florida and attended Piper High School in Sunrise, Florida. He was also a member of the Birmingham Barracudas of the Canadian Football League.

College career
Grilla played for the UCF Knights from 1989 to 1992. Orlando Sentinel's 25th Anniversary UCF Football Team. He set the school record with 103 consecutive extra points made and is second in career field goals made with 47. He kicked a game-winning field goal as time expired on a frozen field in Youngstown, Ohio in 1990 that gave UCF a first-round win in the Division I-AA playoffs against the previously unbeaten Youngstown State Penguins. He was inducted into the UCF Athletics Hall of Fame in 2005.

Professional career
Grilla played for the Albany Firebirds in 1994, earning Second Team All-Arena honors. He was signed by the Birmingham Barracudas in May 1995. He was released by the Barracudas in August 1995. Grilla played for the Orlando Predators from 1997 to 1998.

References

External links
Just Sports Stats

Living people
1970 births
Players of American football from Miami
American football placekickers
Canadian football placekickers
American players of Canadian football
UCF Knights football players
Albany Firebirds players
Birmingham Barracudas players
Orlando Predators players
Piper High School (Florida) alumni